Hellinsia tetraonipennis is a moth of the family Pterophoridae that is found in Guatemala and Mexico (Sonora).

The forewings are pale ochreous and the markings are pale brown. The hindwings and fringes are brown grey.

References

tetraonipennis
Moths described in 1915
Moths of Central America